Paso de Indios is a town in Chubut Province, Argentina. It is the head town of the Paso de Indios Department.

Climate

External links

References

Populated places in Chubut Province